Rabdophaga degeerii is a gall midge which forms galls on the shoots of willows (Salix sp).

Description
The gall can be a smooth, globular or a spindle-shaped swelling on a shoot. The gall chamber is in the pith and contains pale orange larvae or pupae in separate chambers. Correct identification of the host species is important, as the gall of R. degeerii is similar to R. salicis. In Britain the gall on  purple willow (Salix purpurea) is recorded as R. degeerii. Elsewhere the gall has been found on S. daphnoides and S. elaeagnos.

Distribution
The insect or gall has been found in Denmark, France and Great Britain.

References

degeerii
Nematoceran flies of Europe
Gall-inducing insects
Insects described in 1847
Taxa named by Johann Jacob Bremi-Wolf
Willow galls